Beijing Automobile Works Co., Ltd. (BAW) is a Chinese car manufacturer based in Beijing and a subsidiary of BAIC Group. BAW produces light off-road vehicles and trucks. BAW produces civilian as well as military vehicles.

History
Beijing Automobile Works was founded in 1953 as The First Accessory Factory and was renamed to Beijing Automobile Works in 1958. In 1987 the company merged with Beijing Motorcycle Company to become the Automobile and Motorcycle United Company (BAM).

The modern company, Beijing Automobile Works Co.,Ltd (BAW), was founded in 2001 and incorporates the original Beijing Automobile Works, as well as the first Chinese automobile joint venture Beijing Jeep, Beijing Automobile Assembly and Foton Motor.

Products

Passenger cars
Yuanbao/Yanling S3

Off-road
Yusheng 007 (Isheng 007)
Luba/Youxian (Based on the Toyota Land Cruiser Prado)
Qishi (Based on the Jeep Cherokee (XJ), a licensed extended production code named BJ2021.)
BJ2025/BJ6430/BJ6440 Leichi ("Thunder Gallop") - a rebodied Cherokee, with a front design reminiscent of the original Nissan X-Trail & rear second generation Honda CR-V. This vehicle was also exported to Russia and Eastern Europe as the "BAW Reach."

Pickup
Yueling (pickup version of Luba)
Ruiling (pickup version of Yusheng)
F7
Luling (based on the Isuzu TF)
Luling SUV
Foton Sapu

Vans
Xiaohema (Electric panel van based on the Wuling EV50)
M7

Trucks
BJ130 (based on the Isuzu Elf)
BJ136 (based on Toyota Dyna) 
Qiling/Fenix (based on the Isuzu N series)
Qilong/Tonik/BL1 (based on the Isuzu N series)

Minibus
Haice/Haise/B6/009 - a license built fourth generation Toyota Hiace
Ambulance - based on the Haice
BJ6490A – Mitsubishi L300 with a different front end
BD6

Military vehicles
BJ210 (based on the Jeep M-170)
BJ212(4X4)
BJ2020VJ(4X4) 
BJ2022(4X4)(Brave Warrior)
BJ2020VAJ(4X4)
BJ20203(4X4)
BJ2032VJ(4X4)
BJ80J/D/C (C designation removed since 2016, known as BJ80.)

Previous vehicles in history

Jinggangshan 
CB4
Dongfanghong BJ760 (based on the GAZ Volga M21)
Dongfanghong BJ761, replacement of the Dongfanghong BJ760
Hongwei BJ761, station wagon variant of the Dongfanghong BJ761
BJ750/751/752
BJ5020
BJ6410 Fengjing (based on the Renault Scenic)
BJ6470 (based on the Mazda 929)
BJ6490 (based on the Holden Commodore (VN) station wagon)
E-series

References

Car brands
BAIC Group divisions and subsidiaries
Truck manufacturers of China
Car manufacturers of China
Vehicle manufacturing companies established in 1953
1953 establishments in China